Ohio elected its members October 13, 1818.

See also 
 1818 and 1819 United States House of Representatives elections
 List of United States representatives from Ohio

Notes 

1818
Ohio
United States House of Representatives